Ross Bowers may refer to:
 Ross Bowers (American football) (born 1996), American football quarterback
 Ross Bowers (ice hockey) (born 1985), British ice hockey player